Salvation of Innocents is the eighth album by American metalcore band Earth Crisis, released in March 2014 by Candlelight Records. It is their first concept album about animal rights and anti-vivisection. Vocalist Karl Buechner divided the theme into three parts throughout the album: the feelings of the protestors, the viewpoint of the vivisectionists, and what the animals are experiencing. A comic book of the Liberator series published by Black Mask Studios was made in collaboration with the band and released simultaneously with Salvation of Innocents, sharing similar conceptual ideas and artwork.

On July 10, 2020, Salvation of Innocents was reissued on vinyl as a limited edition.

Critical reception 
Salvation of Innocents received positive reviews from music critics. Sam Mendez of Ultimate Guitar wrote that while musically the album did not stand out from the band's previous records, the decision to create a concept album lyrically focused on one social issue made it worthwhile for animal rights activists as well as old and new listeners of Earth Crisis.

Track listing

Credits
 Personnel
 Karl Buechner – vocals
 Scott Crouse – guitar
 Ian "Bulldog" Edwards – bass
 Dennis Merrick – drums
 Erick Edwards – guitar

 Technical personnel
 Chris "Zeuss" Harris – mixing

References

2014 albums
Earth Crisis albums
Candlelight Records albums
Albums produced by Chris "Zeuss" Harris
Concept albums